Wenzao Ursuline University of Languages (WZU) is the only university devoted to language education in Taiwan. It awards A.A., B.A., B.B.A. degrees, and offers a master's degree program conferring M.A., M.B.A., and M.F.A. degrees. Students from abroad can get a visa to study Chinese in Taiwan at Wenzao, as it is one of the 63 Chinese language centers accredited by the Ministry of Education. It is a member of the Association of Christian Universities and Colleges in Asia (ACUCA), the Association of Southeast and East Asian Catholic Colleges and Universities (ASEACCU), The International Council of Saint Thomas Aquinas (ICUSTA), the University Mobility of Asia and the Pacific (UMAP), and the International Association of University Presidents (IAUP).

History
Wenzao Ursuline University of Languages (formerly Wenzao Ursuline College of Languages) was named in honor of Luo Wenzao, the first Chinese bishop. 

It was founded in 1966 by the sisters of the Roman Union of the Order of St. Ursula as "Wenzao Ursuline Junior College of Modern Languages". At the beginning of its establishment, admission was only open to female students. In 1980, Wenzao first opened its doors to male students. In 1999, it was officially restructured to become "Wenzao Ursuline College of Languages". It was renamed "Wenzao Ursuline University of Languages" in 2013.

Colleges and degree programs

College of International Culture, Education, and Foreign Affairs
Department of English (BA, AA, MA)
Bachelor's Degree Program of International Business English (BA)
Department of Translation and Interpreting (BA, MA) 
Bachelor's Degree Program of International Tourism and MICE (BA)
Department of Foreign Language Instruction (BA)
Department of International Affairs (BA, MA) 
Center for English Language Teaching
Center for Teacher Education

College of European and Asian Languages 
Department of French (BA, AA) 
Department of German (BA, AA) 
Department of Spanish (BA, AA) 
Department of Japanese (BA, AA) 
Department of Southeast Asian Studies (BA, MA))
Graduate Institute of European Studies (MA)
European Union Center

College of New Media and Management
Department of Digital Content Application and Management (BBA)
Department of Communication Arts (BA)
Graduate Institute of Creative Arts Industries (MFA) 
Department of Applied Chinese (BA, MA)
Department of International Business Administration (BBA, MBA)

Ursuline College of Liberal Arts
Center for General Education
Center for Ursuline Education
Center for Physical Education

Department of International Affairs (BA, MA) 
International Affairs at Wenzao is curriculum developed based on the rise of globalization with a focus on international culture studies, international politics, and international economics. Above 90% of courses in this department are taught in English.

As of 2021, there are 200 Taiwanese students enrolled in the program and 97 international students from over 10 different countries. Students come from: Indonesia, Thailand, Myanmar, Vietnam, Philippines, Australia, China, Japan, South Korea, Russia, Mongolia, Hungary, Netherland, France, UK, Spain, Turkey, Portugal, Nigeria, Somalia, USA, Nicaragua, Saint Vincent, Brazil, Peru, Switzerland, and Germany.

Since the Spring of 2021, the department of International Affairs has published a student-run magazine to showcase student's articles. The first issue was published in July 2021.

See also
 List of universities in Taiwan

References

1966 establishments in Taiwan
Association of Christian Universities and Colleges in Asia
Educational institutions established in 1966
Language education in Taiwan
Universities and colleges in Kaohsiung
Universities and colleges in Taiwan
Technical universities and colleges in Taiwan